Gwendolyn Wright is an architectural historian, author, and co-host of the PBS television series History Detectives.  She is a professor of architecture at Columbia University, also holding appointments in both its departments of history and art history.  Besides "History Detectives", Dr. Wright's specialties are US architectural history and urban history from after the Civil War to the present.  She also writes about the exchange across national boundaries of architectural styles, influences, and techniques, particularly examining the colonial and neo-colonial attributes of both modernism and historic preservation.

Biography
Gwendolyn Wright attended New York University, and in 1969 received a BA in history and art history.  She did her graduate work at the University of California, Berkeley, and was awarded her M.Arch in 1974 and her PhD in Architecture in 1978.  She published her first book in 1980.

Wright was hired by Columbia University in 1983, two years later becoming the first female to gain tenure in its prestigious Graduate School of Architecture, Planning and Preservation.  She succeeded founder Robert A. M. Stern as director of the Buell Center for the Study of American Architecture, serving in that capacity from 1988 to 1992.

In 2002, she was hired by television producers to be part of what would ultimately become the new TV series "History Detectives".  Back then the working title for the show was “American Attic”, and the initial concept was to tell stories of history through a focus on houses, hence their interest in adding an experienced architectural historian like Wright.  The concept has evolved into solving historical puzzles that use a wide variety of tangible objects to show how historians piece together various kinds of knowledge—and conflicting evidence and diverse perspectives—about what happened, how and why. The show has become one of the most popular and successful programs on PBS.  Wright has remained one of the five hosts in front of the camera from its initial broadcast season in 2003 to the present.  In the show's publicity, she is held up as the team member most likely to suggest how to proceed when the rest are stymied.

She has authored four books, edited two others, and written numerous articles, reviews, and essays.

Gwendolyn Wright has been recognized for her achievements on numerous occasions, including a John Simon Guggenheim Memorial Foundation Fellowship, 2004-5, a Fellowship in the Humanities from the Ford Foundation, 1979–80; a Nina Sutton Weeks Fellowship from the Stanford Humanities Center, 1982–83;  a Fellowship from the University of Michigan Institute for the Humanities, 1991; a Getty Fellowship from the Getty Center for the History of Art and the Humanities, 1992–93; a Beverly Willis Architecture Foundation Fellowship, 2005-6; and a Graham Foundation Fellowship, 2006. She was elected a fellow in the Society of American Historians in 1985, honoring literary quality in historical writing.

Wright is married to the historian Anson Rabinbach. She has a daughter, Sophia Bender Koning, and a stepson, David Bender.

Bibliography

Moralism and the Model Home: Domestic Architecture and Cultural Conflict in Chicago, 1873-1913. 1980 (1985 paperback) University of Chicago Press. 
Chicago residential architectural history in the context of competing economic and cultural forces during the pivotal years 1873-1913.

Building the Dream: A Social History of Housing in America. 1981 (1983 paperback).
New York: Pantheon (MIT Press paperback).   (9780262730648 paperback)
US residential architectural history in the context of other developments since the late 1600s.

The History of History in American Schools of Architecture, 1865-1975. (edited with Janet Parks) 1990 (1996 paperback). New York: Princeton Architectural Press. 
Examination of the role of and changes in the teaching of history within US schools of architecture, including the relationship of architectural history to architectural theory and learning.

The Politics of Design in French Colonial Urbanism. 1991. University Of Chicago Press.  
Morocco, Indochina, and Madagascar architectural history during the French colonial administration.

The Formation of National Collections of Art and Archaeology. 1995. CASVA/National Gallery of Art. 
Examination of the architecture and contents of museums and their role in depicting and shaping national identities and aspirations.

USA: Modern Architectures in History. 2008. Reaktion Press/University of Chicago. 
US architectural history survey emphasizing Modernism as a response to changing economic and cultural conditions since 1865.

See also
 Iva Toguri D'Aquino
 History of Alcoholics Anonymous
 Social situation in the French suburbs

References

External links
About Gwendolyn Wright, page on PBS "History Detectives" website
PBS "History Detectives" Host/Historian Gwendolyn Wright, YouTube interview by Mark Molaro on The Alcove
Gwendolyn Wright , Wright's own website

American television personalities
American women television personalities
American architectural historians
Historians of the United States
Columbia University faculty
UC Berkeley College of Environmental Design alumni
New York University alumni
Living people
American women historians
University of Michigan fellows
Columbia Graduate School of Architecture, Planning and Preservation faculty
Year of birth missing (living people)
21st-century American women